Javalaan is a RandstadRail station in Zoetermeer, Netherlands. It is the final stop of line 4, located on a viaduct. The station opened on 8 October 2007, as part of the Oosterheemlijn (Seghwaert - Javalaan).

Train services
The following services currently call at Javalaan:

Gallery

RandstadRail stations in Zoetermeer